Sharon Ruth Bradley is an Irish actress. She is best known for playing Emily Merchant in Primeval (2011) and Karen Voss in Humans (2015–18). She has also had recurring roles in Legend (6 episodes, 2006), The Innocence Project (8 episodes, 2006–07), Plus One (6 episodes, 2009) and Love/Hate (seasons 1 and 2). Awards she has won include the IFTA Award for Best Supporting Actress in 2007, for her role in Stardust, and a Best Actress award at the Milan International Film Festival 2010 for her starring performance in the film In Her Skin.

Career
Bradley's first screen appearances were in 2002 in Ultimate Force (as Georgia Gracey) and Sinners (as Angela).

Since then, she has had recurring roles in The Clinic (3 episodes, 2003), Love Is the Drug (4 episodes, 2004), Legend (6 episodes, 2006), The Innocence Project (8 episodes, 2006–07), Plus One (6 episodes, 2009) and Love/Hate (seasons 1 and 2).

She presented at the 4th Irish Film and Television Awards in 2007. She won the IFTA Award for Best Supporting Actress in 2007 for Stardust. In 2009, Bradley starred in the film In Her Skin, the true story of an Australian teen who goes missing and is later found to have been murdered by her childhood friend (played by Bradley). Bradley won a Best Actress award at the Milan International Film Festival 2010 for her performance.

In late 2010, she filmed the female lead in the Irish monster movie Grabbers, which opened in August 2012 and later screened worldwide.

She had a recurring role as Emily Merchant in the fourth and fifth series of the ITV science fiction show Primeval.

She played companion Molly O'Sullivan in the Doctor Who audio drama Dark Eyes.

She has appeared as DI Karen Voss in the Channel 4/AMC science fiction series Humans since 2015.

In autumn 2019, she played Angie in the dark and comic BBC series Guilt.

Personal life
Bradley was born in Dublin, Ireland to IFTA winning actress Charlotte Bradley. Bradley lived in Newfoundland, Canada from shortly after birth until she was five. She enrolled in Trinity College Dublin to study drama and languages, but dropped out after three weeks and moved to London, United Kingdom to pursue acting full-time.

Acting credits

Film

Television

Stage

Awards and nominations

References

External links

1987 births
Living people
Irish child actresses
Irish television actresses
Actresses from Dublin (city)
Irish expatriates in the United Kingdom
21st-century Irish actresses